Vincent Signorello is the president and chief executive officer of Florida East Coast Industries, LLC, Florida’s oldest and largest commercial real estate, transportation and infrastructure holding company. He currently oversees all operations and subsidiary companies.

Background 
Signorello earned his bachelor's degree from Boston College in 1992. After spending four years as an officer in the United States Army, Signorello earned his MBA in corporate finance from Boston University in 2001.   After starting out in Lehman Brothers’ real estate investment banking and finance units, Signorello served in Barclays Capital’s New York City-based global commercial real estate group.  
In 2008, Signorello joined Fortress Investment Group, where he was a key member of the private equity team’s management of FECI.

Florida East Coast Industries 
Signorello was named president and CEO of Florida East Coast Industries in 2009. Since that time he has led the significant development and realignment of the company into four separate businesses. They include:
All Aboard Florida, a $2.5 billion transportation and commercial real estate project that will also build express passenger rail service between Orlando and Miami. It is the first privately financed and operated passenger rail service proposed in the United States in more than 50 years;
Flagler Global Logistics, the largest industrial developer in Florida and a fully integrated third-party logistics company focused on the transportation, treatment, and handling of perishable products; 
Parallel Infrastructure, a national leader in third-party right-of-way investments, including telecommunication systems and natural resource pipelines, and; 
Flagler, a full-service real estate company focused on the commercial office sector. It is Florida’s oldest real estate development company.

References

Living people
Year of birth missing (living people)